Białecki, feminine: Białecka; plural: Białeccy) is a Polish-language surname.  It is a toponymic surname literally meaning "from Białcz".

Notable people with this surname include:

Greg Bialecki, American attorney and government figure
 (1947-2018), Polish lawyer, professor 
Małgorzata Białecka (born 1988), Polish windsurfer
 (1838-1887), Polish Venerable nun, the founder of the Polish community  of Dominican Sisters of the Immaculate Conception
Zbigniew Białecki, several people
Zbigniew Białecki, Polish chemical engineer, the namesake of the Bialecki ring
, Polish politician, member of Parliament
, Polish politician, member of Parliament

See also
, another surname with the etymology "from Białcz"
Bielecki

Polish-language surnames